David Thorpe (born 30 May 1948) is a former Australian rules footballer who played with Footscray and Richmond in the VFL.

A centreman, Thorpe played with Footscray from 1965 to 1973. He won the Charles Sutton Medal for the club's best and fairest player in 1968 and 1972. Thorpe missed out on the award in 1969 despite polling well in the Brownlow Medal, finishing the count in 6th position. From that season, until 1972, he represented Victoria at interstate football. For his performance in the 1972 Perth Carnival he earned All Australian selection. 

Thorpe transferred to Richmond in 1974 and was a member of that season's premiership team, defeating North Melbourne in the grand final.

External links

1948 births
Australian rules footballers from Victoria (Australia)
Western Bulldogs players
Richmond Football Club players
Richmond Football Club Premiership players
Port Melbourne Football Club players
Yarraville Football Club players
Yarraville Football Club coaches
Charles Sutton Medal winners
All-Australians (1953–1988)
Living people
One-time VFL/AFL Premiership players